Jalon Renos Doweiya (born 16 November 1983) is a Nauruan weightlifter.

At the Commonwealth Games in Manchester in 2002 he finished in third place in the 77 kg weight class. However, this was later upgraded to a silver medal after Indian Satheesha Rai was disqualified due to doping. He also won gold medals at the Oceania Games, in both 2001 and 2002.

References

Nauruan male weightlifters
1983 births
Living people
Commonwealth Games medallists in weightlifting
Weightlifters at the 2002 Commonwealth Games
Commonwealth Games silver medallists for Nauru
Medallists at the 2002 Commonwealth Games